Mount Chamberlin may refer to:

 Mount Chamberlin (Alaska) in the Brooks Range, Alaska, USA
 Mount Chamberlin (British Columbia) in Canada
 Mount Chamberlin (California) in California, USA